Yevgeni Yevgenyevich Tyukalov (born 7 August 1992) is a Russian professional footballer. He plays for Amkar Perm.

Career
Tyukalov made his Russian Premier League debut for FC Amkar Perm on 25 September 2011 in a game against FC Rostov.

In 2016, he had a short stint in Bulgarian club Slavia Sofia.

References

External links
 

1992 births
Sportspeople from Perm, Russia
Living people
Russian footballers
Russia youth international footballers
Russian Premier League players
FC Amkar Perm players
Russian expatriate footballers
Expatriate footballers in Portugal
U.D. Leiria players
Expatriate footballers in Estonia
FCI Tallinn players
Expatriate footballers in Bulgaria
PFC Slavia Sofia players
FC KAMAZ Naberezhnye Chelny players
Association football midfielders
FC Ararat Moscow players
FC Zvezda Perm players
Meistriliiga players
Esiliiga B players
Russian expatriate sportspeople in Bulgaria
Russian expatriate sportspeople in Estonia
Russian expatriate sportspeople in Portugal